Manon Bollegraf and Meredith McGrath were the defending champions but did not compete that year.

Alexandra Fusai and Nathalie Tauziat won in the final 4–6, 6–3, 6–1 against Eva Melicharová and Helena Vildová.

Seeds
Champion seeds are indicated in bold text while text in italics indicates the round in which those seeds were eliminated.

 Alexandra Fusai /  Nathalie Tauziat (champions)
 Sabine Appelmans /  Chanda Rubin (quarterfinals)
 Silvia Farina /  Barbara Rittner (semifinals)
 Laura Golarsa /  Christina Singer (first round)

Draw

External links
 1997 EA-Generali Ladies Linz Doubles Draw

1997 WTA Tour